Theodore Thomson Flynn   (11 October 1883 – 23 October 1968) was an Australian zoologist and marine biologist and a professor in both Tasmania and the United Kingdom. He was the father of the actor Errol Flynn.

Biography 
Theodore Thomson Flynn was born in Coraki, New South Wales, Australia, the son of Jessie B. (née Thomson) and John Flynn. He became a biology lecturer at the University of Tasmania in 1909, becoming professor in 1911 and teaching there until 1930.

He married Lily Mary (Marelle) Young on 23 January 1909; they had one child together, the film actor Errol Flynn. Flynn and his family then moved to Northern Ireland where he served as the Chair of Zoology at Queen's University of Belfast from 1931 to 1948; he also became director of the marine station at Portaferry.

After the Belfast Blitz, Flynn was the chief casualty officer for the city. On 1 January 1945, Flynn was awarded an Order of the British Empire for his service.

Flynn named one new species of sub-tropical kelpfish he discovered – Gibbonsia erroli – after his son.

Flynn died in Liss, Hampshire, England.

Legacy 
Flynn Lake, Macquarie Island was named after Flynn.

References

External links
 Australian Dictionary of National Biography entry

1883 births
1968 deaths
20th-century Australian zoologists
Academics of Queen's University Belfast
Australian expatriates in the United Kingdom
Australian marine biologists
Fellows of the Linnean Society of London
Fellows of the Royal Society
Fellows of the Zoological Society of London
People from New South Wales
Members of the Royal Irish Academy
Members of the Order of the British Empire
Academic staff of the University of Tasmania